The 1946 LSU Tigers football team was an American football team that represented Louisiana State University (LSU) in the Southeastern Conference (SEC) during the 1946 college football season. In their 12th year under head coach Bernie Moore, the Tigers compiled a 9–1–1 record (5–1 against SEC opponents) and outscored opponents by a total of 240 to 123. They were ranked No. 6 in the final AP Poll and were invited to play in the 1947 Cotton Bowl Classic where they played a scoreless tie against Arkansas.

The Tigers ranked twelfth nationally in team defense, giving up an average of only 178.6 yards per game. 

Offensively, the team was led by quarterback Y. A. Tittle who completed 45 of 95 passes for 780 yards and 13 touchdowns. Other key players included fullback Gene Knight with 473 rushing yards and ends Sam Lyle, Dan Sandifer, and Clyde Lindsey with 162, 159, and 157 receiving yards, respectively.

Four LSU players were honored by the Associated Press (AP) and/or United Press (UP) on the 1946 All-SEC football team: quarterback Y. A. Tittle (UP-1); guard Wren Worley (AP-1, UP-2); fullback Gene Knight (UP-2); and tackle Walter Barnes (UP-2).

Schedule

After the season

The 1947 NFL Draft was held on December 16, 1946. The following Tigers were selected.

References

LSU
LSU Tigers football seasons
LSU Tigers football